Mave: (stylized as MAVE:), is a South Korean virtual girl group formed in 2023 by Metaverse Entertainment. The group consists of Siu, Zena, Marty, and Tyra, who are hyper-realistic, AI-generated members that were created using machine learning, deep fake, and full 3D production technology.

History

2023: Formation and debut
Mave: was formed in 2022, when on November 8, it was reported that Metaverse Entertainment, which is a subsidiary of the game-developing company Netmarble Corporation, were preparing to debut a virtual idol group. The group's creation reportedly follows a change in the Korean music industry as K-pop groups and entertainment companies delve into the possibility of introducing various forms of entertainment into the metaverse; although the group isn't the first to include virtual idols, they are the first K-pop group created entirely within the metaverse. 

The group was formed as a collaboration between Kakao Entertainment and Netmarble, with Kakao involved in investing and distributing the group's music. 

On January 11, 2023, Metaverse Entertainment announced via Twitter that Mave: would be releasing their debut single album ‘Pandora’s Box’ on January 25 with two singles: ‘Pandora’ and ‘Wonderland (Idypia)’. The title track 'Pandora' describes a hopeless future where emotions are lost and regaining hope in a virtual world known as Idypia. 

On February 14, 2023, Kakao Entertainment announced that it would be releasing a webtoon based on the group, called "Mave: Another World", on Kakao Page and Kakao Webtoon on March 20. It will initially be available for domestic readers only, but there are plans for the webtoon to be released globally in the first half of 2023.

Members
Names and positions are adapted from the group's official website:

 Siu: (시우) - leader, vocalist
 Zena: (제나) - vocalist
 Marty: (마티) - rapper
 Tyra: (타이라) - rapper

Discography

Singles albums

Singles

Filmography

Music videos

Notes

References

External links 

K-pop music groups
Musical groups from Seoul
South Korean dance music groups
South Korean girl groups
Girl groups
Virtual influencers
Fictional characters invented for recorded music
South Korean idol groups
South Korean idols
Fictional singers
South Korean pop music groups
Musical quartets
Musical groups established in 2023
Fictional characters introduced in 2023